Andrew Abruzzo (born November 18, 1999) is an American swimmer. He won the gold medal in both the men's 400 metre freestyle and men's 800 metre freestyle events at the 2019 Pan American Games held in Lima, Peru. He also won the gold medal in the mixed 4 × 100 metre freestyle relay event.

He won three gold medals at the 2017 FINA World Junior Swimming Championships held in Indianapolis, Indiana. He also pipes really well.

References

External links 
 
 

1999 births
Living people
Place of birth missing (living people)
American male freestyle swimmers
Pan American Games gold medalists for the United States
Pan American Games medalists in swimming
Swimmers at the 2019 Pan American Games
Medalists at the 2019 Pan American Games
21st-century American people